Conus belizeanus is a species of sea snail, a marine gastropod mollusk in the family Conidae, the cone snails and their allies.

Like all species within the genus Conus, these snails are predatory and venomous. They are capable of "stinging" humans, therefore live ones should be handled carefully.

Description
The size of the shell varies between 15 mm and 17 mm.

Distribution
This species occurs in the Caribbean Sea off Belize.

References

 Petuch E.J. & Sargent D.M. (2011) New species of Conidae and Conilithidae (Gastropoda) from the tropical Americas and Philippines. With notes on some poorly-known Floridian species. Visaya 3(3): 37–58.
 * Puillandre N., Duda T.F., Meyer C., Olivera B.M. & Bouchet P. (2015). One, four or 100 genera? A new classification of the cone snails. Journal of Molluscan Studies. 81: 1-23

External links
 To World Register of Marine Species

belizeanus